Banco Garantia was a bank founded in Rio de Janeiro by businessman Adolfo Campelo Gentil and Jorge Paulo Lemann in 1971. For years it was considered one of the most prestigious and innovative investment banks in Brazil, even being called by Forbes magazine "a Brazilian version" of Goldman Sachs. It was acquired by Credit Suisse in June 1998 and now operates under the name "Banco de Investimentos Credit Suisse".

References

Defunct banks of Brazil
Banks established in the 1970s
1970s establishments in Brazil
Banks disestablished in 1998
1998 disestablishments in Brazil